Luis Barboo (20 March 1927 – 30 September 2001) was a Spanish actor.

He played Baxter Gunman in Per un pugno di dollari (1964). He played Truto in The Demons (1973), and Caronte in La Maldición de Frankenstein (1973), both directed by Jesús Franco.

He played Red Hair in Conan the Barbarian (1982), directed by John Milius and written by Oliver Stone. He appeared in Spanish films like O camiño das estrelas: Galicia (1993), directed by Chano Piñeiro and starring Sabela Páez and Gustavo Salmerón, and Supersonic Man (1979), directed by Juan Piquer Simón.

He died in Madrid in 2001.

Filmography

Films

1964: A Fistful of Dollars as Baxter Gunman #2 (uncredited)
1964: Doomed Fort
1964: Cavalry Charge as Trapper
1965: Assault on Fort Texan as Sub-Lieutnant of Bonnet (uncredited)
1965: Place Called Glory City as Gunman (uncredited)
1965: Espionage in Tangiers as Henchman
1965: Lone and Angry Man as Sbirro
1965: Cotolay
1966: Kid Rodelo
1966: The Sea Pirate
1966: Sugar Colt as 'Bingo'
1966: The Ugly Ones as Federal Agent Outrider
1966: El halcón y la presa as Widow's Ranchero (uncredited)
1966: Tormenta sobre el Pacífico
1966: The Tough One
1967: Clint the Stranger as Farmer (uncredited)
1967: I'll Kill Him and Return Alone as MacGregor's Henchman (uncredited)
1967: Kitosch, the Man Who Came from the North
1967: Gentleman Killer as Ferreres Gang Member (uncredited)
1967: Un hombre vino a matar as Silent Wolf (uncredited)
1967: God Forgives... I Don't! as Full-Bearded Henchman
1968: Killer Goodbye as Townsman (uncredited)
1968: Two Brothers, One Death as Finnegan Henchman (uncredited)
1968: Go for Broke 
1968: Operación Mata Hari
1968: Llego, veo, disparo as Sergeant (uncredited)
1968: Day After Tomorrow as Hud
1968: God Was in the West, Too, at One Time as Zed
1968: Cuidado con las señoras
1968: The Bastard
1968: They Came to Rob Las Vegas as Guard (uncredited)
1968: Dead Men Don't Count as Anderson (uncredited)
1969: Tiempos de Chicago as The Irish
1969: América rugiente as Mechanic
1969: Hell Commandos as SS Sergeant
1969: Alive or Preferably Dead as Cowboy On The Train (uncredited)
1969: Taste of Vengeance as Blake, Henchman (uncredited)
1969: El ángel'''
1969: A Bullet for Sandoval1969: The War Devils as Ally Commander
1970: Fortunata y Jacinta (uncredited)
1970: Robin Hood: the Invincible Archer1970: Arizona Colt Returns as 'Scarface'
1970: Cannon for Cordoba (uncredited)
1971: The Light at the Edge of the World as Calsa Larga
1971: The Case of the Scorpion's Tail as Sharif
1971: Doc (uncredited)
1971: Hannie Caulder as Sheriff Lee (uncredited)
1971: Raise Your Hands, Dead Man, You're Under Arrest as J. Mac
1971: Los días de Cabirio as Chófer
1972: Antony and Cleopatra as Varrius
1972: Drácula contra Frankenstein as Morpho
1972: The Call of the Wild (uncredited)
1972: Les ebranlées1972: El monte de las brujas as Hombre Encadenado 
1973: The Demons as Truro
1973: Female Vampire as Irina's Manservant
1973: The Erotic Rites of Frankenstein as Caronte
1973: The Loreley's Grasp as Alberic, Loreley's Servant
1973: Habla, mudita1973: Three Supermen of the West as Uomo Di Navajo Joe (uncredited)
1973: Yankee Dudler as Sheriff Dave
1973: Return of the Evil Dead as Executed Templar
1973: Me has hecho perder el juicio1973: Lovers of Devil's Island as Lenz
1973: El misterio del castillo rojo1974: Fifteen Year Old Captain as Sailor
1974: Vacaciones sangrientas1974: ¡Caray, qué palizas! as Joe, The Blacksmith
1974: La noche de los asesinos as Rufus
1974: Los nuevos españoles1974: Hay que matar a B. as Assailant #1 (uncredited)
1975: The Wind and the Lion as Gayaan The Terrible
1975: El mejor regalo as Faustino (uncredited)
1976: El soldado de fortuna (uncredited)
1976: Mayordomo para todo as Lucio (uncredited)
1976: 1976: Manuela as 'El Jarapo'
1976: Tiempos duros para Drácula as Marido de Celia
1976: La muerte ronda a Mónica as Isidro
1976: The Second Power as Yajan
1977: El hombre que supo amar as Firpo
1977: Where Time Began1977: March or Die (uncredited)
1977: Del amor y de la muerte1977: A Dog Called... Vengeance1977: Mala racha (TV Movie)
1977: Cuentos de las sábanas blancas1978: The Pyjama Girl Case as Viewer of Body In Glass Case (uncredited)
1978: China 9, Liberty 37 as Henry
1978: Don't Panic as Guarda
1978: Red Gold as Faro
1978: Avisa a Curro Jiménez1978: Cabo de vara (uncredited)
1978: Fantasma en el Oeste1979: Supersonic Man as Harrison
1980: Un cero a la izquierda as 'El Rubio'
1981: Mystery on Monster Island1981: El retorno del hombre lobo as Bandit
1981: Yendo hacia ti as Thompson Henchman (uncredited)
1982: Los diablos del mar1982: Corridas de alegría1982: Conan the Barbarian as Red Hair
1982: Cristóbal Colón, de oficio... descubridor1982: Chispita y sus gorilas as Estúpido #2
1982: Sonata de estío (TV Movie)
1983: La hija rebelde1983: California Cowboys as Paco
1983: El Cid cabreador as Adiano
1984: La zorra y el escorpión as Basilio
1985: La hoz y el Martínez1985: Dirty Game in Casablanca as Duke Foreman
1985: Bad Medicine as Prisoner
1986: El orden cómico1986: Marine Issue as Tough #2
1987: The Trouble with Spies as Zapata
1987: Los alegres pícaros (uncredited)
1988: The Brother from Space1989: Blood and Sand as Old Slaughterer
1989: El río que nos lleva as Guardia Civil
1989: For Better or For Worse as Customs Official
1993: O camiño das estrelas: Galicia (Short)

TV Series

1972: Los paladines1973: The Protectors as Taxi Driver
1975: Kara Ben Nemsi Effendi as Kadi Guardian (uncredited)
1975: Im Auftrag von Madame as Kapitän
1975: Sergeant Berry1976: Los libros1977: Zum kleinen Fisch as Leon
1977: Curro Jiménez as Bandolero
1978: Novela as Paco 'El Herrero'
1979: El extraño señor Duvallier as Delgarini
1981: Cervantes1982: Verano azul as Comerciante
1983: Las pícaras as Carcelero
1984: Teresa de Jesús1989: Pedro I el Cruel1989: Blue Blood as Papa
1989: Ocean as Ramiro
1990: La forja de un rebelde as Marroquí
1992: Crónicas del mal as Gangster del coche
1994: Los ladrones van a la oficina1994: Serie negra'' (final appearance)

References

External links
 

1927 births
2001 deaths
Spanish male film actors
Spanish male television actors
Male Spaghetti Western actors
People from Vigo
Male actors from Galicia (Spain)